Karana may refer to:
Karana, ancient Assyrian-Babylonian city state, modern day Tell al-Rimah
Karrana, a village in Bahrain
Karana (dance) are the 108 key transitions in classical Indian dance described in Natya Shastra
Karana is a caste of Odisha state in India
Karana (astronomy), a historical genre of Indian texts on astronomy
Karana (pancanga), one among the five co-ordinate members (pancanga) in the Indian system of astronomical calculations
Karana (moth), a genus of moths of the family Noctuidae
Kāraṇa, cause and effect in Advaita Vedanta
Karana, colloquial term for Indians in Madagascar
Karana, the main character in Scott O'Dell's novel Island of the Blue Dolphins, who is based on the historical Juana Maria
Karana the Rainkeeper, the god of rain and storms in the EverQuest MMORPG